The Men's coxless four competition at the 1932 Summer Olympics in Los Angeles took place at the Long Beach Marine Stadium.

Schedule

Results

Heats
First boat of each heat qualified for the final, remainder go to repechage.

Heat 1

Heat 2

Repechage
First two qualify to the final.

Final

References

External links
 Official Olympic Report

Rowing at the 1932 Summer Olympics